Chiautla may refer to:
Chiautla de Tapia
Chiautla, State of Mexico